The Play-offs of the 2010 Fed Cup Americas Zone Group I were the final stages of the Group I Zonal Competition involving teams from the Americas. Using the positions determined in their pools, the eight teams faced off to determine their placing in the 2010 Fed Cup Americas Zone Group I, the top countries of each pool played for first to second, while the bottom two of each pool competed for fifth to eighth. The top team advanced to World Group II play-offs, and the bottom two teams were relegated down to the Americas Zone Group II for the next year.

Promotion play-offs
The first placed teams of each pool were placed against each other in a head-to-head round. The winner of the rounds advanced to the World Group II play-offs, where they would get a chance to advance to the World Group II for next year.

Canada vs. Colombia

Third to Fourth play-off
The second placed teams of each pool were placed against each other in a tie. The winner of the tie was allocated third place in the Group while the loser was allocated fourth.

Brazil vs. Paraguay

Relegation play-offs
The last and second-to-last placed teams of each pool were placed against each other in two head-to-head rounds. The losing team of the rounds were relegated to Group II for next year.

Puerto Rico vs. Bolivia

Cuba vs. Chile

Final Placements

  advanced to the World Group II Play-offs, and were drawn against , where they won 5–0. The team thus advanced to World Group II for the next year.
The Puerto Ricans placed sixth overall, while the Cubans did not compete.

See also
Fed Cup structure

References

External links
 Fed Cup website

2010 Fed Cup Americas Zone